St Leonard's Church is a Church of England parish church in the hamlet of Hartley Mauditt, East Hampshire district of Hampshire, England. All that is left of the hamlet is the 12th-century church, the foundations of a manor house, and a large pond, Hartley Pond, which lies opposite the church on the other side of the road. The church is dedicated to St Leonard.

History
The small church was constructed after the Norman Conquest, but its original simplicity was lost with subsequent workmanship, which was out of character with the style of the original building. It was probably built by the de Mauditt family between 1100 and 1125.  It was restored and a bell turret on the west gable was added in 1853–4.

Architecture and fittings

St Leonard's consists of a nave, chancel, and south porch. The 13th century chancel contains some ancient monuments of the Stuart family. The chancel arch is a rare example of the horseshoe form. Some good early tiles on the chancel floor are notable. There are 34 tiles set in two lines on the chancel floor with seven designs. The south doorway is from the end of the 12th century. Several of the windows contain stained glass. Its octagonal font is of Decorated Period style, 15th century.

References

1125 establishments in England
Hartley Mauditt